The UEC European Champion jersey is the distinctive, identifiable  jersey that the winner of a bicycle race receives at European Cycling Championships organized by the European Cycling Union (UEC), such as the European Road Championships and the European Track Championships. The jersey is predominantly blue with gold European stars. The jerseys are awarded in all cycling disciplines, including road cycling, track cycling, cyclo-cross, BMX, mountain biking and indoor cycling.

The jerseys are provided by Santini SMS.

From 2016, its design consist of a three-part blue banner behind three yellow stars.

See also 
 Cycling jersey
 Rainbow jersey

References 

jersey
jersey
Cycling jerseys